Secret Society is an American hip-hop group from Brooklyn, New York. The group was ultimately formed in 2005 by Necro and Non Phixion, but its members had previously collaborated on numerous occasions prior to Secret Society's formation. Previously, all five members of Secret Society had been notable contributors in the underground rap scene.

Band members

Current members
 Necro (Ron Braunstein) – emcee, producer (2005 – Present)
 Ill Bill (William Braunstein) – emcee (2005 – Present)
 Sabac Red (John Fuentes) – emcee (2005 – Present)
 Goretex (Mitchell Manzanilla) – emcee (2005–Present)
 DJ Eclipse (Chris Martin) – scratching (2005 – Present)

External links
 Necro's official MySpace profile
 Ill Bill's official MySpace profile
 Sabac's official MySpace profile
 Psycho+Logical-Records' official MySpace profile

American hip hop groups
Musical groups established in 2005
Musicians from Brooklyn
Horrorcore groups